XHTAM-TDT, virtual channel 2 (UHF digital channel 28), is a  dual Las Estrellas/Canal 5 television station located in Matamoros, Tamaulipas, Mexico, whose over-the-air signal also covers the Rio Grande Valley across the international border in the United States. The station is owned by Grupo Televisa; it is the second Las Estrellas affiliate in the Rio Grande Valley, XERV-TDT being the other. The station also broadcasts Canal 5 on channel 2.2.

History
The station originally signed on for the first time on September 4, 1994, as XHFOX-TV (changed from the original XHRTA-TV before launch), broadcasting programming from the Fox network for Texas' Rio Grande Valley; prior to XHFOX's sign-on and after its switch to Las Estrellas in 2002, viewers in the valley (including McAllen) received their Fox programs on cable via the national Foxnet service. In 2001, its final year as a Fox affiliate, XHFOX broadcast a local newscast at 9:00 p.m. produced by KRGV-TV.

In 2002, XHFOX disaffiliated from Fox and became XHTAM-TV, largely rebroadcasting programming from Las Estrellas. The Fox affiliation was carried over to XHRIO-TV from 2005 to 2012; Fox programming today can be seen on KFXV.

Digital television

Digital channels
The station's digital signal is multiplexed:

XHTAM is one of two Canal 5 transmitters not using virtual channel 5 because the number is used by a nearby US station, in this case KRGV-TV.

References

External links
Canal de las Estrellas 

Las Estrellas transmitters
Television stations in Reynosa
Mass media in Matamoros, Tamaulipas
Television stations in the Lower Rio Grande Valley
Television channels and stations established in 1994
1994 establishments in Mexico